Apristus is a genus of beetles in the family Carabidae, containing the following species:

 Apristus actuosus Casey, 1920 
 Apristus aeneipennis (Schmidt-Goebel, 1846) 
 Apristus aeneomicans Chaudoir, 1850 
 Apristus agitatus Casey, 1920 
 Apristus aimaki (Jedlicka, 1964)
 Apristus apiceciliatus Mateu, 1991 
 Apristus arabicus Mateu, 1986 
 Apristus aratus Andrewes, 1932
 Apristus arrowi Jedlicka, 1936  
 Apristus baderlei Kirschenhofer, 1988 
 Apristus biroi Darlington, 1968  
 Apristus boldorii Straneo, 1943 
 Apristus brunnescens Kirschenhofer, 1988 
 Apristus cephalotus Mateu, 1991 
 Apristus chinensis Jedlicka, 1933
 Apristus coiffaiti Mateu, 1980 
 Apristus constrictus Casey, 1920 
 Apristus cuprascens Bates, 1873 
 Apristus cupreus Andrewes, 1924 
 Apristus cyanescens Csiki, 1932 
 Apristus europaeus Mateu, 1980 
 Apristus gracilis Mateu, 1991 
 Apristus grandis Andrewes, 1937 
 Apristus hololeucus Harold Lindberg, 1950 
 Apristus jaechi Kirschenhofer, 1988 
 Apristus latens (Leconte, 1848) 
 Apristus laticollis Leconte, 1851 
 Apristus latipennis Chaudoir, 1878 
 Apristus liratus Casey, 1920 
 Apristus longulus Bates, 1883 
 Apristus louwerensi Andrewes, 1938 
 Apristus lucidus Andrewes, 1932
 Apristus mexicanus Bates, 1883 
 Apristus miyakei Habu, 1967 
 Apristus montanus Mateu, 1983 
 Apristus nevadensis Casey, 1920 
 Apristus nitens Mateu, 1968 
 Apristus peyerimhoffi Mateu, 1956 
 Apristus phoebus Andrewes, 1932
 Apristus pugetanus Casey, 1920 
 Apristus reticulatus Schaum, 1857
 Apristus rufiscapis Bates, 1873 
 Apristus schmidti Kirschenhofer, 1991 
 Apristus secticollis Bates, 1873 
 Apristus sedlaceki Darlington, 1968 
 Apristus sericeus Darlington, 1934 
 Apristus spatiosus Andrewes, 1932
 Apristus striatipennis Lucas, 1846
 Apristus striatus (Motschulsky, 1844)
 Apristus subaeneus Chaudoir, 1846
 Apristus subcyaneus G.Horn, 1894 
 Apristus subdeletus Casey, 1920 
 Apristus subovatus Chaudoir, 1876 
 Apristus subsulcatus (Dejean, 1826) 
 Apristus subtransparens Motschulsky, 1861 
 Apristus thoracicus Casey, 1920 
 Apristus transcaspicus Mateu, 1991
 Apristus tropicalis Motschulsky, 1864 
 Apristus tuckeri Casey, 1920 
 Apristus turkmenicus Kirschenhofer, 1988

References

Lebiinae